Myski is a rural locality (a settlement) in Gonokhovsky Selsoviet, Kamensky District, Altai Krai, Russia. The population was 90 as of 2013. There are 5 streets.

Geography 
Myski is located 34 km southeast of Kamen-na-Obi (the district's administrative centre) by road. Gonokhovo is the nearest rural locality.

References 

Rural localities in Kamensky District, Altai Krai